Richard Bernard Vail (August 31, 1895 – July 29, 1955) was an American businessman and U.S. Representative from Illinois.

Background

Richard B. Vail was born on August 31, 1895, in Chicago, Illinois. He attended public school, the School of Commerce, the Chicago Technical College, and the John Marshall Law School.

Career

During World War I, he served in the United States Army as a lieutenant of infantry. He then engaged in the manufacture of steel products.

Federal service

Vail worked for the Federal Bureau of Investigation (FBI) before running for office.

Vail was elected as a Republican to the Eightieth Congress (January 3, 1947 – January 3, 1949). He served on the House Un-American Activities Committee.

He was an unsuccessful candidate for reelection in 1948 to the Eighty-first Congress. Vail was elected to the Eighty-second Congress (January 3, 1951 – January 3, 1953). He was an unsuccessful candidate for reelection in 1952 to the Eighty-third Congress and for election in 1954 to the Eighty-fourth Congress.

Private sector

He served as chairman of the board of directors of the Vail Manufacturing Company of Chicago. Vail manufactured staplers, paper clips, and fasteners and was eventually acquired by Acco International in 1966.

Personal and death

Vail died age 59 on July 29, 1955, in Chicago and was interred in Holy Sepulchre Cemetery in Alsip, Illinois.

See also
 80th United States Congress
 House Un-American Activities Committee
 List of members of the House Un-American Activities Committee

References
Specific

General
  Retrieved on January 26, 2008

1895 births
1955 deaths
Politicians from Chicago
United States Army officers
United States Army personnel of World War I
Republican Party members of the United States House of Representatives from Illinois
20th-century American politicians
Military personnel from Chicago
Burials at Holy Sepulchre Cemetery (Alsip, Illinois)